Conrad Green is a television producer. He is noted for his successful work on reality television shows.

He has been producer or executive producer for such shows as Dancing with the Stars, Big Brother, Ibiza Uncovered, Red Handed, The Pride of Britain Awards and Popstars. In 2001, after his success with launching Big Brother UK and Popstars, he was hired as BBC's head of New Entertainment Development. A year later he was hired by 19TV, the company that produced Pop Idol and moved to the United States.

After working on shows for multiple US networks, he went on to show-run Dancing with the Stars from its inception to season 18.  Following this, he show-ran Utopia, You the Jury and Crime Scene Kitchen as well serving as executive producer on My Kitchen Rules for Fox, and was show runner of The Gong Shows revival on ABC and Go-Big Show on TBS.

As of 2021, he currently resides in Los Angeles, working as executive producer on numerous projects for broadcast networks.  He has won BAFTA, RTS, Broadcast and Montreux TV Festival Awards for his work in the U.K. and been nominated for multiple Producers Guild and eight Emmy Awards for his work in the US.  He has won People's Choice, GLAAD, and NAACP Image Awards, amongst others, in the US.

Filmography
Big Brother (2000) – producer
Popstars (2001) – producer
The Murder Game (2003) – executive producer
Dancing with the Stars (2005-2014, 2022–present) – producer
Utopia (2014) – executive producer
My Kitchen Rules (2017) – executive producer
The Gong Show (2017) – executive producer
You the Jury (2017) – executive producer
Ultimate Tag (2020) – executive producer

External links

American television producers
Living people
Year of birth missing (living people)